A shopping court is a type of neighborhood shopping center that developed, particularly in Greater Los Angeles, in the 1920s. Most had a few boutiques, themed shops (as today in a festival marketplace), and cafes, up to a dozen and sometimes included offices and studios. A linear walkway or patio connected the units, which was relatively new, as up to then, collections of shops under a management or coordination were connected by a public sidewalk, as in Westwood Village or Country Club Plaza. Patios of buildings in Mexico, Latin America and the Mediterranean inspired the design on the shopping court, as those regions also inspired much of the Southern California architecture during that era, e.g. Spanish Colonial Revival architecture.  Shopping courts proliferated in the 1930s in affluent residential areas such as Hollywood, Beverly Hills, and Pasadena, and in resorts like Palm Springs and Santa Barbara. They were limited in impact as the scale could not accommodate larger stores and store windows did not draw attention of passing motorists.

Examples
 Carmel-by-the-Sea – Carmel Plaza
 Carthay Circle – Carthay Center (planned, mostly unbuilt
 Downtown Los Angeles – Olvera Street (in form a pedestrian mall, but the selection of shops, restaurants and stands were selected as for a themed shopping court)
 Fairfax District –
Farmers Market (not a true farmer's market)
Town & Country Market
 Hollywood – Crossroads of the World
 Southwest Los Angeles – Producer's Public Market
 Santa Barbara – El Paseo
 Ventura – La Floreira

In Mexico:
 Pasaje Polanco in Mexico City, 1938; Colonial californiano style

References

Culture of Los Angeles
Architectural terminology
Shopping malls by type